Patience Aghimile Igbiti is a Nigerian Paralympian coach and former athlete. In 2008, she won the bronze medal in the women's 60 kg powerlifting category at Beijing 2008. After her retirement, she became a Paralympic coach and was part of Team Nigeria's coaching crew for the 2016 Summer Paralympics.

References 

Paralympic athletes of Nigeria
Paralympic silver medalists for Nigeria
Medalists at the 2004 Summer Paralympics
Medalists at the 2008 Summer Paralympics
Living people
Year of birth missing (living people)
Paralympic medalists in powerlifting
Powerlifters at the 2004 Summer Paralympics
Powerlifters at the 2008 Summer Paralympics
21st-century Nigerian women